Valpelline is one of the side valleys of the Aosta Valley in north-west Italy. It shares its name with one of the communes within its territory (Valpelline).

The stream running through the Valpelline is the River Buthier.

Geography
The Valpelline branches from the Great St Bernard Valley near Gignod and rises to Collon Pass, which it shares with Valais, and which is located at the foot of the Grand Combin, whose peak is across the border in Switzerland.

Principal mountains
 Dent d'Hérens (4,171 m)
 Punta Margherita (Pointe Marguerite) (3,905 m)
 Dents des Bouquetins (3,838 m) 
 Tête de Valpelline (3,802 m)
 Tête Blanche (3,724 m)
 Mont Vélan (3,708 m)
 Gran Becca Blanchen (3,680 m)
 Grande Tête de By (3,587 m)
 Aouille Tseuque (3,554 m)
 Mont Brulé (3,538 m)
 Becca Rayette (3,529 m)
 Mont Gelé (3,519 m) 
 Becca di Luseney (Pic de Luseney) (3,504 m)
 Punta Kurz (3,496 m)
 Château des Dames (3,488 m)
 Punta di Fontanella (3,384 m)
 Becca di Chardoney (Pic de Chardoney) (3,447 m)
 Punta Cian (Pointe Tsan) (3,320 m).

Rivers
The main stream of the Valpelline is the Buthier, which is fed by melt-waters of the Tsa de Tsan and Grandes Murailles glaciers.

Lakes
 Place-Moulin Lake (1,950 m)

Alpine passes

Valpelline has no convenient crossings to its neighbouring valleys, However the principal passes are as follows:

 Valpelline Pass (3,562 m) to Mattertal
 Col d'Oren (3,242 m) to the valley of Bagnes
 Collon Pass (3,130 m ) to Val d'Herens
 Valcornera Pass (3,066 m) to the Valtournenche
 Crête Sèche Pass (2,888) to the valley of Bagnes
 Vessona Pass (2,794 m) to Vallone di Saint-Barthélemy
 Fenêtre de Durand (2,786 m) to the valley of Bagnes

Climate
The Valpelline is known locally in Valdôtain patois as the Coumba frèida (or Fr., Combe froide, literally the cold hollow) due to its particularly harsh climate.

History

The valley was for a long period a site of exchange—or of conflict—with the neighbouring Valais.

In the Middle Ages the valley was a possession of the lords of Quart, which they granted to the noble family of the district known as La Tour-de-Valpelline (or La-Tour-des-Prés).

On the  extinction of the Quart Family in 1377, Valpelline passed to the House of Savoy. In 1612 it was assigned to the Perrone di San Martino, a Piedmontese noble family involved in the exploitation of the mine at Ollomont.

The valley was for many centuries difficult of access: the first carriage road to Bionaz was constructed in 1953.

Centres of population

 Bionaz
 Doues
 Oyace
 Ollomont
 Roisan
 Valpelline

Places of interest

The parish of Saint-Pantaléon de Valpelline
The parish of Saint-Pantaléon de Valpelline is regarded as one of the most ancient of the Great St Bernard Valley. First documented in 1176 it included the settlements of Bionaz, Oyace and Ollomont. The current church, built in 1722, has three important chapels: the first, dedicated to Our Lady of the Snows, is the work of Vignettes (1755); the second, dedicated to Saint Roch, is the work of Semon (1640); and the third, dedicated to Saint Barbara, is the work of Thoules (1663).

Tourism

Hikers are catered for by a number of mountain huts (rifugi) and bivouac shelters:

 Rifugio Franco Chiarella all'Amianthe (2,979 m)
 Rifugio Champillon (2,835 m)
 Rifugio Nacamuli al Col Collon (2,818 m)
 Rifugio Aosta (2,781 m)
 Rifugio Crête Sèche  (2,398 m)
 Rifugio Prarayer (2,005 m)
 Bivacco Perelli Cippo (3,831 m)
 Bivacco Biagio Musso (3,664 m)
 Bivacco Paoluccio (3,572 m)
 Bivacco Tête des Roeses (3,200 m)
 Bivacco della Sassa (2,979 m)
 Bivacco Nino Recondi (2,650 m)
 Bivacco Rosazza al Savoie (2,650 m)
 Bivacco Franco Spataro (2,600 m)
 Bivacco La Lliée (2,422 m)

Organisations

The Compagnie des guides du Valpelline — the association of Alpine guides for the Valdôtain (Italian) basin of Grand Combin—is based at Étroubles.

Notable personalities
The abbé Joseph-Marie Henry parish priest of Valpelline from 1903 to 1947, was a botanist, alpinist, historian and author of the Histoire populaire religieuse et civile de la vallée d'Aoste.

The works of Mario Glassier, a dialect poet born in 1931 in Oyace, include L'etéila di bon berdzé.

Attribution
This article began life as a translation of the corresponding article in the Italian language Wikipedia.

External links

 Website of the Unité des communes valdôtaines du Grand-Combin.
 Website of the Compagnie des guides du Valpelline

Valleys of Aosta Valley
Valleys of the Alps